The following is a list of venues that have hosted the NCAA Division I men's basketball championship. Venues that have not yet hosted, but have been officially announced as future tournament sites, are also included. (Note that in most cases, the modern name of the venue is used, though it may have been known under a different name at the time.)

First Four

Between 2001 and 2010, this round was a single game known as the "Opening Round." In 1983, there were four games in the Opening Round with two games in Philadelphia and two games in Dayton. In 1984, there were five games in the Opening Round with three games in Philadelphia and two games in Dayton.

First and Second Rounds

Regionals

Final Four
Between 1939 and 1951, the National Semifinals were hosted at the Regional sites and the National Championship game was hosted at a separate site. For those years, this table only includes the host of the National Championship game. In 1952, the Final Four evolved to the current format of four Regional winners meeting at a separate site.

Total Number of Rounds Hosted

See also
List of basketball arenas by capacity
List of NCAA Division I basketball arenas

References

Venues
 
NCAA Division I men's basketball tournament venues
Basketball Tournament